Lyric Records may refer to:

Lyric Records (Germany), a German record label
Lyric Records (US), an American record label